Alexander Marello (born 28 September 1988) is a Canadian professional soccer player, who plays for Vancouver Metro Soccer League club Inter FC.

Early and personal life 
Marello was born to Italian immigrants in Vancouver, British Columbia. His brother Joe Marello, is former semi-professional soccer player in the Canadian Soccer League.

Career
Marello attended the Alpha Secondary school and played club soccer for Burnaby Royals., before playing college soccer for the Cincinnati Bearcats in 2006. He moved to the Buffalo Bulls in 2007. During his last year at the Bulls, he played for Vancouver Whitecaps FC Residency in the PDL. After his graduation in 2011 he signed for Dutch club Veendam. He played 11 games for Veendam in the Eerste Divisie, before returning to Vancouver Whitecaps FC Residency in March 2012, making a further 7 appearances for them in the PDL. Than joined to club Khalsa Sporting Club and played for the club, six months in the Pacific Coast Soccer League. In August 2013 Marello signed for Inter FC in the Vancouver Metro Soccer League.

International 
Marello was called up to the Canada men's national under–17 soccer team for the first time for a training camp in Burnaby in February 2014.

Honours 
 2014: BC Adult Player of the Year

Notes

1988 births
Living people
Canadian soccer players
SC Veendam players
Association football midfielders
Vancouver Whitecaps FC U-23 players
Expatriate footballers in the Netherlands
University at Buffalo alumni
USL League Two players
Canada men's youth international soccer players
Soccer players from Vancouver